Alon Harel (born 1957) is a law professor at the Hebrew University of Jerusalem, where he holds the Phillip P. Mizock & Estelle Mizock Chair in Administrative and Criminal Law. He was educated at the Hebrew University of Jerusalem, Yale University, and Balliol College, Oxford (where he earned a D.Phil. in legal philosophy with a dissertation supervised by Joseph Raz). He has been a visiting professor at Columbia University, Harvard University, the University of Toronto, the University of Texas at Austin, and the University of Chicago.

Harel writes on political philosophy, jurisprudence, criminal law, constitutional law, and law and economics. His articles often undertake philosophical and legal issues of contemporary political relevance. In a recent article (co-authored with Yuval Eylon), Harel defends judicial review on the grounds of a "right to a hearing", which, as a participatory right, does not conflict with the right to equal democratic participation.

A leading advocate of Israeli human rights in Israel, Harel has served on the board of directors of the Association for Civil Rights in Israel, and submitted a Brief on Behalf of Conscientious Objectors to the Israeli Supreme Court. He often publishes op-ed pieces in Israeli newspapers. A member of Academia for Equality, an organization working to promote democratization, equality and access to higher education for all communities living in Israel.

Harel is the founder and editor of the journal Jerusalem Review of Legal Studies, together with David Enoch.

In 2015, Harel drew criticism for degrading a right-wing student on his Facebook page, tagging her in a post and suggesting that she "return to first grade civics lessons." The student also said that Harel sent her a personal Facebook message at 2:00am informing her of the post that he wrote.

Books

Selected publications 
.
.
.
.
.

References

External links 
Harel's homepage at the Hebrew University
 Judah, Ben, "The dignity of the human in Israel: interview with Alon Harel", The Alligator Online, 2 February 2009
 Why Law Matters, in Oxford Legal Philosophy
 Will Baude, Book Review: ‘Why Law Matters,’ by Alon Harel, The Washington Post,  6 November 2014
 Barbara Baum Levenbook, Alon Harel Why Law Matters, Notre Dame Philosophical Reviews, 6 October 2015

1957 births
Living people
Israeli jurists
Israeli philosophers
Hebrew University of Jerusalem alumni
Yale University alumni
Alumni of Balliol College, Oxford
Academic staff of the Hebrew University of Jerusalem